Hans Jacob Sparre (1861—1937) was a Norwegian architect.

He was born in Nore, Norway in 1861 to Ole Jacob Sparre and Anne Petronelle Enger. He was educated in Hanover, Germany under C. W. Hase in 1883. After graduation, he worked in Arendal as a manager at a technical school for three years. From 1886 until 1892, he worked as an architect in Plauen, Oldenburg, and Berlin, Germany. From 1892 to 1896, Sparre was a city architect in Bergen, where he designed a building at Domkirkegaten 4 (1895) in the neo-renaissance style. He moved to Kristiania in 1897, where he started his own architecture firm, partly in collaboration with Herman Major Backer. He is known for designing the justice building in 1903 which is the home of the Supreme Court of Norway.

He was the brother of Christian Sparre. He was a long time member of the Liberal Party of Norway.

Works
 Addition to the Bergen Museum (1897–98)
 Justisbygningen (Supreme Court of Norway), Kristiania (1895-1903)
 St. Johannes Church, Stavanger (1900)
 Sæle Church, Balestrand (1903)
 Gaupne Church, Luster (1907)
 Stemshaug Church, Aure (1908)
 Sjøli Church, Rendalen (1914)

References

1861 births
1937 deaths
Architects from Oslo